Dr B. J. Choubey (15 September 1934 – 19 February 2008) was a scholar of Zoology and University professor at Tilka Manjhi Bhagalpur University. He is best known for his contribution in the field of endocrine research at University of Bhagalpur. He was a research student under the guidance of Dr. P. Thapliyal] at Banaras Hindu University.His scholarly publications have influenced many researchers in this field.

Publications

References

20th-century Indian zoologists
1934 births
2008 deaths
Academic staff of Tilka Manjhi Bhagalpur University